The Florida State University College of Communication and Information, located in Tallahassee, Florida, was created in a merger of the Florida State University College of Information with FSU's College of Communication on July 1, 2009. The merged College of Communication & Information includes three schools:

 The Florida State University School of Communication, established in 1967, which offers degrees and certificates in areas such as Media Studies/Communication Studies and Media Production;
 The Florida State University School of Communication Science and Disorders, established in the 1970s, which focuses on areas such as speech-language pathology and audiology; and,
 The Florida State University School of Information, established in 1947, which provides degrees and certificates in areas such as Information, Information Technology, and Health Informatics.

Dr. Larry C. Dennis is the current dean of the Florida State University College of Communication and Information.  Institutes, centers, clinics, and other special units operating within the College of Communication and Information include:

 The Center for Hispanic Marketing Information
 The Center for Information Management and Scientific Communication
 Goldstein Library
 The Information Use, Management and Policy Institute
 L.L. Schendel Speech and Hearing Clinic
 Partnerships Advancing Library Media (PALM) Center
 The Project Management Center
 Seminole Productions

School of Communication

The School of Communication is home to Seminole Productions, a sports production effort.

Advertising 

Most classes in the major have limited enrolment.

Media/Communication Studies

Digital Media Production 

The Digital Media Production Program is a limited-access program.

The undergraduate major is typically a two-year program with an emphasis in one of two areas: Documentary and Public Affairs or Sports Media.

Seminole Productions 

Established in 1987, Seminole Productions, Florida State University's professional production group, provides visual communications support for FSU as well as Government and other agencies throughout the State of Florida.

Public Relations 

The Public Relations program is a limited access program designed to train students in public relations and strategic communication, from audience analyses to message and content productions and evaluations.

National rankings
U.S. News & World Report (2015 Edition)
Library & Information Studies - 13th overall
Digital Librarianship - 11th overall
School Library Media - 1st overall
Services for Children and Youth - 5th overall
Online Graduate Information Technology - 20th overall
In 2014, the school media program was ranked 1st in the nation by U.S. News & World Report.

References

External links

 

 
Information schools
2009 establishments in Florida